Ronald Šiklić (born 24 November 1980 in Zagreb) is a Croatian retired football defender.

External links
 

Šiklić profile, detailed club statistics

1980 births
Living people
Footballers from Zagreb
Association football defenders
Croatian footballers
GNK Dinamo Zagreb players
HNK Šibenik players
NK Inter Zaprešić players
Odra Wodzisław Śląski players
Dyskobolia Grodzisk Wielkopolski players
Górnik Łęczna players
Lechia Gdańsk players
FC Kryvbas Kryvyi Rih players
NK Slaven Belupo players
SK Slavia Prague players
SK Dynamo České Budějovice players
FC Hlučín players
Croatian Football League players

Czech First League players
Croatian expatriate footballers
Expatriate footballers in Poland
Croatian expatriate sportspeople in Poland
Expatriate footballers in Ukraine
Croatian expatriate sportspeople in Ukraine
Expatriate footballers in the Czech Republic
Croatian expatriate sportspeople in the Czech Republic